Four Flicks is a concert DVD collection by British rock band the Rolling Stones, filmed during the band's Licks World Tour in 2002–2003. The collection was released exclusively through Best Buy on 11 November 2003, which caused other retailers to remove the band's previous releases from their stores.

Four Flicks was certified 19× multi-platinum in the United States and 2× diamond in Canada; for a combined total of 675,000 shipments in those regions.

Track listing

Disc 1: Documentary
Tip of the Tongue Documentary

Extras
Licks Around the World
Toronto Rocks DVD Trailer
Bootlegs:
 "Beast of Burden"
 "You Don't Have to Mean It"
 "Rock Me Baby"
 "Bitch"
 "I Can't Turn You Loose"
 "Extreme Western Grip"
 "Well, Well"
(1–4: 4 November 2002 at Wiltern Theatre, Los Angeles, CA, USA)(5: 8 June 2003 at Circus Krone, Munich, Germany)(6,7: In-studio)
Select-a-Stone: "Monkey Man" (Multi-angle)

Disc 2: Arena Show
18 January 2003 at Madison Square Garden, New York City, NY, USA

 "Street Fighting Man"
 "If You Can't Rock Me"
 "Don't Stop"
 "Monkey Man"
 "Angie"
 "Let It Bleed"
 "Midnight Rambler"
 "Thru and Thru"
 "Happy"
 "You Got Me Rocking"
 "Can't You Hear Me Knocking"
 "Honky Tonk Women" (with Sheryl Crow)
 "(I Can't Get No) Satisfaction"
 "It's Only Rock 'n Roll" (B-stage)
 "When the Whip Comes Down" (B-stage)
 "Brown Sugar" (B-stage)
 "Jumpin' Jack Flash"

Extras
Band Commentaries:
 "Street Fighting Man"
 "Happy"
 "It's Only Rock 'n Roll"
Sheryl Crow and the Stones
Making the HBO Special
Custom Setlist
Select-a-Stone: "Honky Tonk Women" (Multi-angle) (Concert only)

Disc 3: Stadium Show
24 August 2003 at Twickenham Stadium, London, England

 "Brown Sugar"
 "You Got Me Rocking"
 "Rocks Off"
 "Wild Horses"
 "You Can't Always Get What You Want"
 "Paint It Black"
 "Tumbling Dice"
 "Slipping Away"
 "Sympathy for the Devil"
 "Star Star" (B-stage)
 "I Just Want to Make Love to You" (B-stage)
 "Street Fighting Man" (B-stage)
 "Gimme Shelter"
 "Honky Tonk Women"
 "(I Can't Get No) Satisfaction"
 "Jumpin' Jack Flash"

Extras
Band Commentaries
 "Gimme Shelter"
 "(I Can't Get No) Satisfaction"
 "Sympathy for the Devil"
AC/DC and the Stones
Jumbotron Animation
Custom Setlist
Backstage Pass (Concert only)

Disc 4: Theatre Show
11 July 2003 at Olympia Theater, Paris, France

 "Start Me Up"
 "Live with Me"
 "Neighbours"
 "Hand of Fate"
 "No Expectations"
 "Worried About You"
 "Doo Doo Doo Doo Doo (Heartbreaker)"
 "Stray Cat Blues"
 "Dance (Pt. 1)"
 "Everybody Needs Somebody to Love"
 "That's How Strong My Love Is"
 "Going to a Go Go"
 "The Nearness of You"
 "Before They Make Me Run"
 "Love Train"
 "Respectable"
 "Honky Tonk Women"
 "Brown Sugar"
 "Jumpin' Jack Flash"

Extras
Band Commentaries
 "Start Me Up"
 "Honky Tonk Women"
 "Jumpin' Jack Flash"
Solomon Burke and the Stones
Playing the Olympia
Custom Setlist
Backstage Pass (Concert only)
Select-a-Stone: "Angie" (Multi-angle)

Charts and certifications

Weekly charts

Certifications

See also
 The Biggest Bang

References

The Rolling Stones video albums
2003 live albums
2003 video albums
Live video albums
The Rolling Stones live albums
Albums recorded at Madison Square Garden